John Patrick Kenny (27 May 1915 – 26 June 1989) was an Australian rules footballer who played with North Melbourne in the Victorian Football League (VFL).

Kenny played his first game with Camberwell on Saturday, 18 June, 1938, against Port Melbourne, after coming across from North Melbourne Reserves

Notes

External links 
		

1915 births
1989 deaths
Australian rules footballers from Melbourne
North Melbourne Football Club players
Camberwell Football Club players
People from Camberwell, Victoria